Gradišče pri Divači is a small settlement in the Municipality of Divača in the Littoral region of Slovenia.

Name
The name of the settlement was changed from Gradišče to Gradišče pri Divači in 1953.

Church
The local church is dedicated to Saint Helena.

References

External links
Gradišče pri Divači on Geopedia

Populated places in the Municipality of Divača